Queens—Lunenburg was a federal electoral district in the province of Nova Scotia, Canada, that was represented in the House of Commons of Canada from 1925 to 1949 and from 1953 to 1968.

This riding was created in 1924 from parts of Lunenburg and Shelburne and Queen's ridings. It consisted of the counties of Queens and Lunenburg. It was abolished in 1947 when it was redistributed into Lunenburg and Queens—Shelburne ridings.

The district was re-created in 1952 from Lunenburg and Queens—Shelburne, and was abolished in 1966 when it was merged into South Shore riding.

Members of Parliament

This riding elected the following Members of Parliament:

Election results

Queens—Lunenburg, 1925–1949

Queens—Lunenburg, 1953–1968

See also 

 List of Canadian federal electoral districts
 Past Canadian electoral districts

External links 
 Riding history for Queens—Lunenburg (1924–1947) from the Library of Parliament
 Riding history for Queens—Lunenburg (1952–1966) from the Library of Parliament

Former federal electoral districts of Nova Scotia